Roebuck Stadium is a 5,000-seat multi-use stadium in the southern area of Elizabeth City, North Carolina on the campus of Elizabeth City State University. The stadium is known mostly as the home of the school's football team though it is also used by the track & field team and occasionally by local soccer teams.

Athletics (track and field) venues in North Carolina
Elizabeth City State University
Elizabeth City State Vikings football
Sports venues in Pasquotank County, North Carolina
College football venues
Soccer venues in North Carolina
American football venues in North Carolina
1983 establishments in North Carolina
Sports venues completed in 1983